Weyauwega is a city in Waupaca County, Wisconsin, United States. The population was 1,900 at the 2010 census. The city is located mostly within the Town of Weyauwega, though it is politically independent of the town. Small portions extend north into the adjacent Town of Royalton. The city is commonly referred to as "Wega" by local residents. The name "Weyauwega" is described by the Weyauwega Chamber of Commerce as potentially meaning "Here we rest" in a local indigenous language because the town's origin was a stopping/resting point between two rivers when Native Americans had to portage their canoes. Given the local indigenous culture is described as Menominee the language may be the Menominee language if this etymology for Weyauwega is correct. 

European colonist activity in the area began with a small building set up by fur traders, from which the town later grew.

Geography
Weyauwega is located at  (44.322, -88.933).

Demographics

2010 census
As of the census of 2010, there were 1,900 people, 746 households, and 473 families living in the city. The racial makeup of the city was 96.4% White, 0.3% African American, 0.2% Native American, 0.2% Asian, 0.1% Pacific Islander, 1.6% from other races, and 1.3% from two or more races. Hispanic or Latino of any race were 6.1% of the population.

There were 746 households, of which 33.1% had children under the age of 18 living with them, 43.4% were married couples living together, 12.5% had a female householder with no husband present, 7.5% had a male householder with no wife present, and 36.6% were non-families. 29.8% of all households were made up of individuals, and 11.7% had someone living alone who was 65 years of age or older. The average household size was 2.43 and the average family size was 2.98.

The median age in the city was 38.2 years. 25.3% of residents were under the age of 18; 8.9% were between the ages of 18 and 24; 24.9% were from 25 to 44; 23.7% were from 45 to 64; and 17.3% were 65 years of age or older. The sex demographics of the city were  49.7% male and 50.3% female.

2000 census
As of the census of 2000, there were 1,806 people, 720 households, and 460 families living in the city. The population density was 1,201.7 people per square mile (464.9/km2). There were 763 housing units at an average density of 507.7 per square mile (196.4/km2). The racial makeup of the city was 97.84% White, 0.39% Black or African American, 0.22% Native American, 0.17% Asian, 0.28% from other races, and 1.11% from two or more races. 0.94% of the population were Hispanic or Latino of any race.

There were 720 households, out of which 31.4% had children under the age of 18 living with them, 50.4% were married couples living together, 9.7% had a female householder with no husband present, and 36.0% were non-families. 29.6% of all households were made up of individuals, and 13.6% had someone living alone who was 65 years of age or older. The average household size was 2.39 and the average family size was 2.98.

In the city, the population was spread out, with 25.3% under the age of 18, 7.6% from 18 to 24, 29.0% from 25 to 44, 18.9% from 45 to 64, and 19.2% who were 65 years of age or older. The median age was 37 years. For every 100 females, there were 92.9 males. For every 100 females age 18 and over, there were 87.6 males.

The median income for a household in the city was $34,556, and the median income for a family was $42,067. Males had a median income of $32,073 versus $22,609 for females. The per capita income for the city was $16,755. About 3.8% of families and 6.5% of the population were below the poverty line, including 2.7% of those under age 18 and 11.5% of those age 65 or over.

Transportation
Weyauwega is located on Wisconsin Highway 110. U.S. Route 10 and Wisconsin Highway 49 are located just south and west of the city. The Yellowstone Trail ran through the city, and its former route is denoted by signs through the downtown and northern portions of the city.

Education
Weyauwega is served by the Weyauwega-Fremont School District, which has an enrollment of about 963 students. The district has a high school, a middle school, and two elementary schools, one in Weyauwega and another in nearby Fremont, Wisconsin.

St. Peter Lutheran School is a 3K-8 grade school of the Wisconsin Evangelical Lutheran Synod in Weyauwega.

History
Weyauwega has been host to the annual event Horse and Buggy Days since 1961. The event celebrates the past significance of the horse and buggy in the community. The event is presented by the Weyauwega Chamber of Commerce and features a parade, music and other activities.

The Waupaca County Fair has been held in Weyauwega since 1874 at the Waupaca County Fairgrounds at the East end of the City of Weyauwega.

In 1996 An 81-car freight train derailed causing a large fire and several explosions from the hazardous materials in the train cars, prompting an evacuation of the town for two weeks until the fires burned out.

Notable people
Albert V. Balch, Wisconsin State Representative
Lyman E. Barnes, U.S. Representative from Wisconsin
Benjamin P. Birdsall, U.S. Representative from Iowa
Robert Bloch, Author of the 1959 novel Psycho
Mark Block, Chief of Staff for the Herman Cain 2012 presidential campaign
Eliada W. Brown, member of the Wisconsin State Assembly
George de Rue Meiklejohn, U.S. Representative from Nebraska
Sona (Hunter) Mehring, Founder of CaringBridge
George S. Merry, South Dakota State Representative
William E. Merry, South Dakota state legislator
Hallie H. Rowe, member of the Wisconsin State Assembly

See also
Weyauwega derailment (railroad accident) of March 4, 1996

References

External links
Weyauwega Chamber of Commerce
Weyauwega Public Library
Sanborn fire insurance maps: 1894 1901 1909 1917

Cities in Wisconsin
Cities in Waupaca County, Wisconsin